El brillo de mis ojos (The Brightness of My Eyes) is the third studio album by Mexican Christian music singer Jesús Adrián Romero.  The album, which features Dove Award-nominated Spanish Christian singer and songwriter Marcos Vidal on the third track, "Jesús", was released on 26 March 2010 through Vástago Producciones.  A special edition of the album was released that same year.

History 
Months before the album was released, rumors spread over the internet about the possible recording of a new album by Romero and since then many evidence began to appear on the social media, including the album title and photos.

Track listing

References

2010 albums
Jesús Adrián Romero albums